Āboliņš (Old orthography: Ahbolin; feminine: Āboliņa) is a Latvian surname, derived from the Latvian word for "clover" and "trefoil". Individuals with the surname include:

Gundars Āboliņš (born 1960), Latvian actor
Uldis Abolins (1923-2010), Latvian-Australian painter, member of Six Directions
Valters Āboliņš (born 1985), Latvian orienteer

Latvian-language masculine surnames